The 1878 New Zealand census was the first held in four years. Information is taken from the NZ census website. The population of New Zealand was 414,216.

References

Censuses in New Zealand
Census
New Zealand